A total solar eclipse will occur on October 4, 2089. A solar eclipse occurs when the Moon passes between Earth and the Sun, thereby totally or partly obscuring the image of the Sun for a viewer on Earth. A total solar eclipse occurs when the Moon's apparent diameter is larger than the Sun's, blocking all direct sunlight, turning day into darkness. Totality occurs in a narrow path across Earth's surface, with the partial solar eclipse visible over a surrounding region thousands of kilometres wide. The tables below contain detailed predictions and additional information on the Total Solar Eclipse of 4 October 2089.

Gregorian Calendar: October 4, 2089

Julian Calendar: September 21, 2089

Saros: 145 (26/77)

Node: Ascending

Greatest Eclipse: 2089 October 04 at 01:13:26.4 UTC

Eclipse Magnitude: 1.03333

Eclipse Obscuration: 1.06777

Gamma: 0.21671

Ecliptic Conjunction: 2089 October 04 at 01:15:43.6 UTC

Equatorial Conjunction: 2089 October 04 at 01:06:16.2 UTC

Sun Right Ascension: 12h42m34.2s

Sun Declination: -04º34'29.0"

Sun Diameter: 1918.2 arcseconds

Sun Equatorial Horizontal Parallax: 0º00'08.8"

Moon Right Ascension: 12h42m49.6s

Moon Declination: -04º22'10.5"

Moon Diameter: 1950.0 arcseconds

Moon Equatorial Horizontal Parallax: 0º59'38.5"

Delta T: 1 minute, 56.8 seconds

Related eclipses

Solar eclipses 2087–2090

Saros series 145

Tritos series

Notes

References

2089 10 04
2089 in science
2089 10 04
2089 10 04